The 1977 NFL Championship Series was the 2nd edition of the NFL Night Series, an NFL-organised national club Australian rules football tournament between the leading clubs from the SANFL, the WANFL, the VFA and State Representative Teams.

Following the success of the 1976 competition, the 1977 edition was originally planned to be a full-scale national competition that would feature all the VFL, SANFL and WANFL teams plus representative teams from Tasmania, Queensland, New South Wales and the ACT. But in late 1976, the VFL announced they were withdrawing from the national competition to form their own rival night series, the VFL Night Series.

Following this decision, the NFL decided to replaces the VFL teams with the top four VFA teams from the previous season, a surprising move considering the VFA was expelled from the ANFC in 1970.

Qualified Teams

1 Includes previous appearances in the Championship of Australia.

Venues

Knockout stage

Round 1

Round 2

Quarter-finals

Semi-finals

NFL Championship Series final

References

Australian rules interstate football
History of Australian rules football
Australian rules football competitions in Australia
1977 in Australian rules football